The Cygnet Football Club is an Australian rules football club playing in the Southern Football League, also known as the SFL, in Tasmania, Australia.

Origins
Cygnet began as Lovett Football Club in 1906, and changed its name to Cygnet in the 1910s. The Magpies were a member of the Huon Football Association from 1906-1997 when the league disbanded and they joined the SFL in 1998. Upon entry in the SFL they changed from their longtime Black & White playing strip and Magpie emblem, adopting a Port Adelaide playing strip (black, white and teal) and called themselves 'The Port'.

Entry to Southern Football League 
1998

Huon Football Association Premierships (31) 
1912, 1913, 1915, 1922, 1923, 1925, 1926, 1928, 1931, 1935, 1938, 1945, 1947, 1948, 1950, 1951, 1955, 1957, 1960, 1962, 1964, 1966, 1967, 1968, 1970, 1972, 1974, 1976, 1979, 1984, 1994

Tasmanian Country Football Champions (2) 
1947, 1948

SFL Premierships (4) 
2002, 2003, 2004, 2021

SFL Runners Up (4) 
1998, 2005, 2020, 2022

Peter Hodgeman Medallists
2004 - Jeremy Brereton

William Leitch Medallists 
2001 - Damien Dillon
2021 - Thor Boscott

Tony Martyn Medallists 
2002 - Gordon Shaw 
2003 - Heath Dillon
2004 - Grant Clark

Gorringe-Martyn Medallists
2021 - Thor Boscott

SFL Leading Goalkicker 
1998 - Micheal Darcy - 106 
2003 - Micheal Darcy - 113 (Regional League)
2004 - Micheal Darcy - 105 (Regional League)
2005 - Micheal Darcy - 100 (Regional League)
2007 - Micheal Darcy - 103 (Regional League)
2013 - Ben Halton - 88 
2020 - Josh Fox - 61

Club Games Record Holder 
450 by Greg Gordon (310: Seniors - 110: Reserves - 30: Underage) between 1973-1998

Senior Games Record Holder 
345 by Laurence 'Ocker' Jarrett

Record Goals In A Match
HFA - 22.4 by Greg Howard v Franklin (24 July 1976)

SFL - 15 by Micheal Darcy v Channel (2 June 2007)

Club Record Attendance

Club Record Score 
HFA - Unknown

SFL - Cygnet 52.17 (329) v Claremont 0.0 (0) - Abbotsfield Park (29 May 2021)

References

External links
Official website

Australian rules football clubs in Tasmania
1906 establishments in Australia
Australian rules football clubs established in 1906